Shortcut Island is a crescent-shaped island  long, with three prominent indentations of the north shore, lying  SSE of Gamage Point and Palmer Station along the SW coast of Anvers Island. The suggestive name was given by Palmer Station personnel. The narrow, deep channel separating this island from Anvers Island is a shortcut from the station to the Biscoe Bay area by water.

See also 
 Composite Antarctic Gazetteer
 List of Antarctic islands south of 60° S
 SCAR
 Territorial claims in Antarctica

References

External links 

Islands of the Palmer Archipelago